Sahatu Ayagi is voluntary school in Kano, Nigeria. Sahatussibyan Littahfeezil Qur'an Ayagi (Arabic: ساحة الصبيان لتحفيظ القران اياغى, Sahatussibyan Littahfeezil Qur'an) means the place where children memorizes the Qur'an. Sahatussibyan Littahfeezil Qur'an Ayagi was founded by Sheikh Kabiru Sani Salihu Ayagi in Kano. The school was established at Malam Salihu Abubakar Wada's house, well known as Malam Barau Mai Goro. Over 20 years ago, people from many places came to the house for Islamic studies.

History
The school was established on 13 Shawwal 1413 A.H. (13 Oct 1992). The purpose was to give lessons to twelve children at noon on Thursdays and Fridays. They were the children of the school proprietor, Hajji kabuki Sana Aging, and the children of his brothers. They studied the Qur'an, Ilmul-Tajweed and Fiqh. The neighbors showed interest for their children. The father of proprietor, Malay Sana Mubarak Wade, asked the proprietor to make the school for everyone who has interest for his children. Then the proprietor made the school open to everyone who had interest to join on 20 Rabi' al-awwal 1414 A.H. (12 Sept 1993).

Sahatussibyan Littahfeezul Qur'an Ayagi (Evening section)
When the school began, they held an evening section every Saturday to Thursday, moving to various people's houses since they did not have a school building. They had at that time one single room to keep the school's documents, which Ustaz Kabiru Sani borrowed from his uncle Malam Barau before the school got its own place. The management made that it as an office where they used it to keep the school documents and records. The students used mats during the class hours. One of the richest man around the place gave the donation of some tables and chairs  The management made them for the students who are in tahfeez classes and others used mats for their lessons which Dala local government gave it as a donation. Now the college has more facilities, as well as students, with the current count approximating 2500 students.

In 2000 the people around the school also donated some funds and bought the school a building, which the school's management ended up demolishing and rebuilding because the old building's capacity was inadequate to accommodate the students. Now the school has a completed big building which belongs to Sahatussibyan Ayagi, with twelve classrooms, four offices, one mosque, and ten toilets. However the place was still not enough for the students because it could not hold all the pupils, some of them still taking their classes outside the school. The school kept its practice of borrowing people's places to give its students their lessons because all the school premises were already occupied with other children. The school still needed help from other organizations or individuals to help the school get another place for its children to round their pupils in one comfortable place that enables the teachers to easily control the students and ensure the pupils' safety. The school also needs a lot of teaching materials to give the children quality education which is Sadat Riyadh and the voluntary teachers who want to scarify themselves in the way of Allah. The school needs donations, either in the form of money, or volunteers, or in any other form to help give children good quality Islamic education.

Ummahatul Mu'uminat Ayagi (Sahatu)
In 1993 the housewives throughout the area showed their interest in the school. Hajiya Khadija Musa Bako organized classes from Saturday until Wednesday – the school opening from 8:00 pm to 10:00 pm. The school director, Shekh Kabir Sani gave the school name (Ummahatul Mu'uminat Ayagi (Sahatu) Kano No. 183a Ayagi).

Sahatussibyan Littahfeezul Qur'an Ayagi (Morning section)
In 1997 the school opened another section, which is a primary school for memorising the Qur'an. Under the Dala Local Government Education Authority, (Sahatussibyan Littahfeezul Qur'an Ayagi, Kano Nigeria No 183A Kano, Morning Section), the school opens every Saturday until Thursday from 8:00am to 12:30 pm.

College of Qur'anic Studies Ayagi
College of Qur'anic Studies Ayagi (Arabic: كلية علوم القران الكريم اياغ). In 2000 the school opened a secondary school section for memorizing the Qur'an, under the Ministry of Education Kano State which is called College of Qur'anic Studies Ayagi, Kano Nigeria, No. 555 Ayagi B, Kano. In year 2000, Alhaji Garba Wada built complete classes, offices, and toilets to the school, which are four classrooms, three offices, and two toilets which belong to the college. Now the school has more than six hundred students (600) but the place is not enough for the students, because they are in many classes. The school needs help from individuals or organisations for more facilities or another place which can hold many students containing many classes, office, restrooms, and hiring other qualified teachers to the college.  Every year, the school had rejected many students during the admission because the place is very small, it could not hold so many students. The school considered that if the students are many in the single classroom, some will not understand what is the teacher doing, and the people are showing interest to their children. The college needs help to make the place comfortable and big for the society use.

The school offered many courses, the majors are: Qur'an, Tajweed, Hadeeth, Fiqh, English, Mathematics, Agriculture, Economics, and many more. The school is opening 7:30 am until 2:30 from Monday to Friday. In 2006 the college held its first graduation ceremony on the school premises, on 12 August 2006. The students collected their certificate from the chairman and managing director of the college, Ustaz Kabiru Sani Salihu Ayagi, on behalf of the Ministry of Education, Kano State. Now most of the students who have graduated from college were admitted into higher schools and universities throughout the country. Some of them are studying at other international universities like Dubai, Egypt, Saudi Arabia, Malaysia, Sudan, Niger, Bahrain, and many more.

Awards
Sahatu has produced many students who have memorised Qur'an; most of them are participated in local government qura'nic competition (Musabaqa), state, federal and some of them are participated in international Qur'anic competition (Musabaqa). In 2006 one Sahatussibyan student participated in worldwide Musabaqa, Malama Khadija Musa, where represented Nigeria on 40 Hizb with Tafsir.

Some awards that Sahatu received from government and organizations:

 Best Islamism School in Dala Local Government 1997.
 Best Islamism school in metropolitan schools 2001.
 Best Islami studies teaching guide Ministry of Education 2003.
 Tajweed best school in Kano state 1999.
 Most helpful school in metropolitan 1994
 Good condition 2008.
 Teaching instruction 2002.
 Good management  2008/2009.

Opening and closing hours
The school is open every Saturday until Thursday from 7:00 am to 10:00 pm.

The school has three sections:
 Morning section opening every Saturday to Thursday from 8:00 am to 1:00 pm
 Evening section opening every Saturday to Thursday from 2:00 pm to 6:00 pm
 Magrib  section opening every Saturday to Wednesday after magrib prayer to isha'i

Board of directors
 Sheikh Kabiru Sani  Salihu Ayagi (Managing Director)
 Malam Mahmud Mukhtar Umar (Managing Director I and Head Master of Sahatussibyan)
 Malam Rabi'u Uthman Babi (Managing Director II and principal College of Qur'anic Study ayagi)
 Hajiya Khadija Musa Bako (Managing Director III and Head Mster Ummahatul Mu'uminat Ayagi)
 Malam Muhammad Sani Ali  (Head Master I Sahatussibyan Ayagi)

References

Religious schools in Nigeria
Educational institutions established in 1992
1992 establishments in Nigeria
Kano